This is a list of districts in the Royal Borough of Kingston upon Thames:

 Berrylands
 Canbury
 Chessington
 Coombe
 Kingston upon Thames
 Kingston Vale
 Malden Rushett
 Motspur Park (part) 
 New Malden
 Norbiton
 Old Malden
 Surbiton
 Tolworth
 Worcester Park (part) 

Kingston upon Thames